Reforma de Pineda is a town and municipality in Oaxaca in south-western Mexico. The municipality covers an area of 193.92 km2.   
It is part of the Juchitán District in the west of the Istmo de Tehuantepec region.

As of 2005, the municipality had a total population of 2691.

References

Municipalities of Oaxaca